The Elmezzi Graduate School of Molecular Medicine is a private graduate college in Manhasset, New York, associated with Northwell Health and located at North Shore University Hospital. As of spring 2010, the school had 5 students enrolled.

The school was chartered in 1994 but closed due to the closure of its parent institution, the Picower Institute. In 2001, the school was acquired by the North Shore-LIJ Institute for Medical Research and revived as the North Shore LIJ Graduate School of Molecular Medicine and again to the Elmezzi Graduate School of Molecular Medicine in 2008. The latter renaming took place after a $15 million donation from the Thomas and Jeanne Elmezzi Private Foundation. As of 2020, the school has 41 graduates.

See also
 Jeffry Picower

References

Private universities and colleges in New York (state)
Northwell Health